Diploporita is an extinct class of blastozoan that ranged from the Ordovician to the Devonian. These echinoderms are identified by a specialized respiratory structure, called diplopores. Diplopores are a double pore system that sit within a depression on a single thecal (body) plate; each plate can contain numerous diplopore pairs.

The diploporitans likely represent a polyphyletic group. The evidence for this claim lies within the highly morphologically diverse body plans of the diploporitans: there are major differences in the makeup of the attachment structure (e.g., stem or holdfast), in the makeup of the feeding grooves, and even major differences in the construction of the group-defining diplopore respiratory structures. The only phylogenetic analysis of Diploporita to date  indicates that Diploporita is not a natural evolutionary group. Rather, Diploporita is an artificial grouping based on the presence of diplopores, that have re-evolved multiple times throughout the echinoderm evolutionary tree.

Evolution

Major Taxonomic Groups 
There are three major groups of Diploporita that have been traditionally proposed: the Asteroblastida, Glyptosphaeritida, and the Sphaeronitida. These three groups, which are markedly different from one another, are found in approximately the same age strata in the Early Ordovician of the Prague Basin. 
Of these proposed groups, only one has been thought to be monophyletic: the Sphaeronitida. This group is characterized by short ambulacral feeding grooves and holdfasts that cement directly to a hard substrate, instead of a stem.

Ancestry 
At this time, it is not clear to which group Diploporita is most closely related. It has been suggested that the paraphyletic group Eocrinoidea could have given rise to diploporitans, as well as other groups of blastozoans, but the evidence for this is inconclusive at this time.

Distribution
Information concerning the distribution of diploporitan fossils is constantly changing, as more field sites are found and fossils from these are described. This description of diploporitan fossil occurrences is only meant to be a general introduction and is not an exhaustive list.

Ordovician
Diploporitans in the Ordovician were very diverse, with a high estimate of 176 species. Diploporitans are routinely found preserved from the Ordovician in Gondwana (i.e., southern Europe, northern Africa, the Middle East), Baltica, South China, and European Laurentia (e.g., United Kingdom). Ordovician Occurrences of diploporitans in North American Laurentia are limited to only a very small number of instances. The Late Ordovician Bromide Formation is one of the few, and likely the most well-known, outcrops of diploporitan fossils, Eumorphocystis multiporata

Silurian 
The end-Ordovician extinction represented a large-scale extinction for diploporitans. The majority of diploporitan species went extinct during this period and they never returned to their high species numbers after this time. During the Silurian, there was a much larger presence of diploporitans in North American than during the Ordovician. These diploporitans, called the Holocystites Fauna, appeared in North America during the middle of the Silurian. These diploporitans, representing multiple genera, all share the same basic features: reduced food grooves, large plates to support feeding structures that branched off of the surface of the body, and specialized diplopore respiratory structures, called humatipores (diplopores that are connected by multiple canals below the surface of the plate). The Holocystites Fauna is mostly found in the midcontinental United States (e.g., Indiana, Wisconsin, Tennessee) and does not survive past the end of the Silurian. 

Other Silurian occurrences of diploporitans worldwide are rare and limited to only a few species (e.g., Eucystis). These occurrences are largely restricted to southern Europe.

Devonian
Devonian occurrences of diploporitans are also quite rare. Most examples of this are, similar to the Silurian, limited to a few species in southern Europe. It was thought that diploporitans likely went extinct during the Early Devonian. However, a recent discovery found a new genus of diploporitan from the Middle Devonian, 50 million years after the last known diploporitan occurrence, in Kentucky, USA (Laurentia)

References 

Blastozoa